The Battle of Thessalonica in 1004 was one of the many attacks of the Bulgarian emperor Samuel against the second most important Byzantine city in the Balkans, Thessalonica. Eight years earlier Samuel had defeated the governor of Thessalonica, Gregory Taronites. The attack in 1004 was undertaken immediately after the end of one of the regular campaigns of the Byzantine emperor Basil II into Bulgaria. Despite the Bulgarian defeat in the battle of Skopje, after the withdrawal of Basil II Samuel answered by invading the Byzantine dominions in turn. He ambushed the governor of Salonica John Chaldos near his city and captured him.

This chronology of events was presented by the historian Vasil Zlatarski. Other researches such as Srdjan Pirivatrich and Plamen Pavlov assume that Samuel's victory over Gregory Taronites was in 995, while the defeat of John Chaldos took place in 996.

References 

Conflicts in 1004
11th century in Bulgaria
1000s in the Byzantine Empire
Battles involving the First Bulgarian Empire
Battles of the Byzantine–Bulgarian Wars in Thessalonica
1004 in Europe
Military history of Thessaloniki